Balon may refer to:

 Baloň, a village and municipality in the Trnava Region of southwest Slovakia
 Balon (surname)
 Balon Greyjoy, a character in A Song of Ice and Fire
 Balon's ruffe, a species of freshwater ray-finned fish
 Don Balón, a Spanish weekly sports magazine

See also 
 Ballon (disambiguation)